Solid State Records is a Christian metalcore record label, an imprint of Tooth & Nail Records. Unlike Tooth & Nail, Solid State signs hardcore punk and heavy metal bands. Like Tooth & Nail, Solid State is primarily a Christian label. However, they have signed several bands with Christian members that don't label themselves as Christian bands, including Stretch Arm Strong, Gwen Stacy, He Is Legend, the Famine, Training for Utopia, and the Agony Scene.

Current artists 
 Azusa
Becoming the Archetype
 The Devil Wears Prada
 The Drowned God
 Earth Groans
 Empty
 Fit for a King
 Lifelong
 Lightworker
 Norma Jean
 Oh, Sleeper
 The Ongoing Concept
 Opponent
 OrphanTwin
 Phinehas
 Silent Planet
 Spirit Breaker
 The Undertaking!
 Wolves at the Gate

Former artists

Active 

 Advent (Bridge 9 Records)
 The Agony Scene (Outerloop Records)
 As Cities Burn (Equal Vision Records)
 As They Sleep (Luxor Records)
 August Burns Red (SharpTone Records)
 Beloved (unsigned)
 Blindside (unsigned)
 Death Therapy (unsigned)
 Demon Hunter (Weapons MFG)
 Destroy the Runner (unsigned)
 Emery (Tooth & Nail Records)
 Few Left Standing (unsigned)
 Forevermore (unsigned)
 Haste the Day (unsigned)
 He Is Legend (Spinefarm Records)
 Life in Your Way (Come&Live!)
 Living Sacrifice (unsigned)
 Mantric (Tooth & Nail Records)
 MyChildren MyBride (eOne/Good Fight)
 My Heart to Fear (Luxor Records)
 Once Nothing (unsigned)
 Showbread (unsigned)
 Soul Embraced (Rottweiler)
 Stretch Arm Strong (independent)
 Trenches (Noise Order)
 Underoath (Fearless Records)
 Zao (Observed/Observer)

Disbanded 

 3rd Root
 Bloodshed (members went on to join The O.C. Supertones and Project 86)
 Born Blind (members also in No Innocent Victim)
 The Chariot (members in '68 and I Am Terrified)
 Cry of the Afflicted
 The Death Campaign (members also in Officer Negative)
 Embodyment (members went on to form The Famine)
 Eso-Charis (vocalist Cory Brandan Putman now fronts Norma Jean, bassist Arthur Green and drummer Matthew Putman went on to join Living Sacrifice)
 The Famine (members also in Embodyment and Society's Finest)
 Focal Point (guitarist Ryan Clark went on to join Training for Utopia and is now in Demon Hunter)
 Gwen Stacy (members also in Once Nothing)
 Inhale Exhale (members also in Narcissus and Relient K)
 Innermeans
 Luti-Kriss (went on to form Norma Jean)
 Officer Negative (members also formed The Death Campaign)
 Overcome (members in Some Dark Hallow and Sanhedrin)
 Selfmindead (members now in Benea Reach)
 Sever Your Ties
 Soapbox
 Still Breathing
 Strongarm (members went on to form Further Seems Forever)
 Training for Utopia (members went on to form Demon Hunter)
 Twelve Gauge Valentine (members went on to join, Alesana, Swamp Basstard, and The Greenery)
 Warlord (members went on to Pilgrims and Roadside Monument)

On hiatus or inactive 

 The Ascendicate (guitarist Ryan Helm went on to Demon Hunter, and start Damien Deadson)
 Dead Poetic (drummer Jesse Sprinkle currently working solo)
 Everdown (Urban Achiever Records)
 Extol (Facedown Records)
 Figure Four (two members are currently with Comeback Kid)
 Lengsel (members now in Mantric)
 No Innocent Victim (members working for Facedown Records)
 Society's Finest
 Spitfire (Goodfellow Records; two members in Sunndrug)
 The Overseer (members in Project 86 and Wolves at the Gate)
 The Showdown (three members in Demon Hunter, one member in Still Remains)
 To Speak of Wolves (one member in Oh Sleeper)

Affiliated artists

Active 
 Bruce Fitzhugh and Jeremiah Scott (appears on Killing Floor 2 Original Soundtrack)
 Impending Doom (eOne Music) (appears on Killing Floor 2 Original Soundtrack)
 Memphis May Fire (Rise Records) (appears on Midnight Clear)
 Project 86 (Independent) (appears on This is Solid State, Volume 3)
 zYnthetic (appears on Killing Floor 2 Original Soundtrack)

Disbanded 
 Dirge (vocalist John Gibson became former president of Tripwire Interactive) (appears on Killing Floor 2 Original Soundtrack)
 For Today (members went on to form Nothing Left) (appears on Midnight Clear)
 Narcissus (members went on to form Inhale Exhale)
 Unashamed (members went on to the O.C. Supertones and the Dingees)

On hiatus 
 Far-less (appears on This Is Solid State Records, Volume 6)

See also 

 Tooth & Nail Records
 BEC Recordings
 List of record labels
 Tooth & Nail Records discography

References

External links 
 Official website

Record labels established in 1997
American record labels
Christian record labels
Hardcore record labels
Heavy metal record labels
Christian hardcore